PlanetOut, Inc. is an online media company or entertainment company exclusively targeting the lesbian, gay, bisexual and transgender (LGBT) demographic.

Originally founded as an early internet-based media company by Tom Reilly in 1995, it operated several LGBT-themed web sites, the first being an independent producer Forum on the Microsoft Network (MSN).

History
PlanetOut launched in August 1995 on the Microsoft Network, founded by Tom Rielly and a core team of co-founders including their first staff member Darren Nye as MSN Producer and Community Director, Christian Williams as Technical Director, Jenni Olson as Arts & Entertainment Producer (PopcornQ) and Greg Gordon as News Producer.

In April 1996, with Rielly as President and Jon Huggett as CEO, PlanetOut Inc. closed its first round of funding, a $3 million minority share investment by Sequoia Capital and America Online. In September 1996 PlanetOut launched its services on the web.

By late 1996, culture challenges with management and strategy choices by the CEO were plaguing the company and Rielly was removed as president. In January 1997, Sequoia Capital exited as an investor, while the majority of other investors including America Online remained in support. Huggett left the company and Rielly temporarily returned as CEO.

At the close of the year in 2006, the company reported a $3.7m loss on revenue of $68.6m. Although this was a 93 percent improvement on 2005 revenues, the purchase of RSVP was the beginning of the end for PlanetOut.

In April 2008, PlanetOut released a letter of intent to sell LPI and specialty publications to Regent Releasing, which owns here! Films.

References 

Companies based in San Francisco
Internet properties established in 1995
LGBT-related mass media in the United States
Mass media companies of the United States